Vermont Route 107 (VT 107) is an east–west state highway in Windsor County, Vermont, United States. VT 107 mostly serves to connect VT 100 to Interstate 89 (I-89).

Route description
VT 107 begins at an intersection with VT 100 in the town of Stockbridge. It follows the course of the White River east and northeast through the community of Riverside. Northeast of Riverside, VT 107 enters the town of Bethel, where it intersects VT 12. The two roads run concurrently for just under . Near the Bethel Town Forest, the two routes split; VT 12 heads west while VT 107 heads east into the town of Royalton. Near its eastern end, VT 107 intersects I-89 at a folded diamond interchange. The route ends at VT 14 near the center of the town.

Major intersections

See also

 List of state highways in Vermont

References

External links

107
Transportation in Windsor County, Vermont